Albert Henry Clarke (9 May 1906 – 17 December 1974) was an Australian rules footballer who played for the North Melbourne Football Club in the Victorian Football League (VFL).

Clarke was recruited from Club in the Ovens and Murray Football League.

Notes

External links 

1906 births
1974 deaths
Australian rules footballers from New South Wales
North Melbourne Football Club players
Albury Football Club players
Corowa Football Club players